Attention deficit hyperactivity disorder or ADHD is a psychiatric disorder.

ADHD or A.D.H.D. may also refer to:

ADHD (band), an Icelandic band, or their 2009 eponymous album
A.D.H.D. (Master Shortie album), a 2009 album by Master Shortie
ADHD (Joyner Lucas album), a 2020 album by Joyner Lucas
"ADHD" (Blood Red Shoes song)
"A.D.H.D" (Kendrick Lamar song)
Animation Domination High-Def, a programming block on FXX